The Waterfall is a 2001 Turkish comedy-drama film, written and directed by Semir Aslanyürek, about a famous painter returning to his hometown to remember his childhood in a politically divided home just before the 1960 military coup d'état.

Cast
Hülya Koçyiğit as Semra
Tuncel Kurtiz as Kel Selim
Aykut Oray as Yusuf Usta
Ali Sürmeli as Süleyman
Ege Aydan as Sami
Nurgül Yeşilçay as Nergis
Enis Aslanyürek as Cemal
Savaş Yurttaş as Münir Ağa
Ezel Akay as Callud
Zuhal Tatlıcıoğlu as Şehra
Canan Hoşgör as Cemile

References

External links 

2001 films
2000s Turkish-language films
2001 comedy-drama films
Films set in Turkey
Turkish comedy-drama films